Donald Blake Rix,  (1931 – November 6, 2009) was a Canadian pathologist, philanthropist, community volunteer, and businessman. He was the founder and chair of MDS Metro Laboratory Services (now known as LifeLabs Medical Laboratory Services), the largest private medical laboratory in Western Canada.

He was a member of several organizations and foundations including the BC Innovation Council, BC Cancer Agency Foundation, BC Medical Services Foundation, and the BC Children's Hospital Foundation and was the chairman of the Board of Governors of UNBC.

Dr. Rix earned a specialty certificate in general pathology in 1968 from the University of Western Ontario. He was a fellow of the College of American Pathologists, the Royal College of Physicians and Surgeons of Canada, the Royal Society of Medicine, and the American Society of Clinical Pathologists. He was awarded honorary doctorates by the British Columbia Institute of Technology (BCIT) and the University of Western Ontario, Simon Fraser University, University of British Columbia, and University of Victoria. He was the former chair of the Vancouver Board of Trade, a senior member of both the British Columbia and Canadian Medical Associations, and was awarded the BCMA Silver Medal of Service Award in 2004. On August 19, 2009, Dr. Rix was awarded the Canadian Medical Association's 2009 F.N.G. Starr Award.

Donald Rix died of cancer on November 6, 2009. In 2014, it was revealed that he was the first patient in the world to have received personalized onco-genomics on a research basis as part of his cancer treatment.

References

External links

Rix Awards for Engaged Community and Corporate Citizenship - Greater Vancouver Board of Trade

1931 births
2009 deaths
Businesspeople from Ontario
Canadian pathologists
Canadian philanthropists
Members of the Order of Canada
Members of the Order of British Columbia
University of Western Ontario alumni
British Columbia Institute of Technology alumni
People from Orillia
Biotechnologists
20th-century philanthropists
20th-century Canadian businesspeople